The Liverpool County Football Association Senior Cup, commonly known as the Liverpool Senior Cup, is a football knockout tournament involving teams from the city of Liverpool, England and surrounding areas.

It is the County Cup competition of the Liverpool County Football Association and involves non-league clubs as well as the three professional teams in Merseyside: Everton, Liverpool and Tranmere Rovers. However, while non-league clubs often field their first team in the competition, the professional clubs generally field their reserve teams.

Competition history

The first Liverpool Senior Cup was played for in 1882–83, with Bootle (1879) becoming the inaugural winners, and the competition has taken place most seasons since then.

The Cup was suspended during most of the First World War, but continued during the Second World War, largely in the form of exhibition matches between Liverpool and Everton wartime teams.

Prescot Cables defeated Southport 2–0 in the 2016–17 final at Volair Park, with Andy Scarisbrick scoring the winner in the second half. The game received widespread attention from national news outlets when fans celebrating Joe Herbert's opening goal caused a section of the fence to collapse.

2022–2023

Byes to Second Round - AFC Liverpool, Bootle, Litherland REMYCA, Lower Breck, Marine, Southport & Warrington Rylands.

Byes to Quarter Finals - Everton & Tranmere Rovers.

First round

Second round

Quarter-finals

Semi-finals

Semi Finals are due to take place at the end of March or early April at a date to be agreed between the competing clubs.

2019–2020

Byes to Second Round - AFC Liverpool, Burscough, City of Liverpool, Litherland REMYCA, Pilkington, Runcorn Town, St Helens Town & Widnes.

Byes to Quarter Finals - Everton & Tranmere Rovers.

First round

Second round

Quarter-finals

Competition not completed due to Covid Pandemic.

2017–2018

Byes – Everton, Tranmere Rovers, Southport

Did Not Enter – Liverpool

First round

Quarter-finals

Semi-finals

Final

Past winners

Table of winners

Recent finals
Results of Finals since 2001–02 are:

See also
Lancashire Senior Cup

Notes and references

External links
 Liverpool County F.A. Official Website 

County Cup competitions
Sports competitions in Liverpool
Recurring events established in 1882
Football in Merseyside
1882 establishments in England